L'Hillil (عمي موسي) is a locality in Algeria, North Africa.  L'Hillil is located at 35° 43' 19" North, 0° 21' 13" East. in Relizane Province, Algeria. Relizane Township, is 31.2 km away.

History
During the Roman Empire a town called Baliana stood here. Baliana was also the seat of an ancient Christian bishopric, which exists today as a titular see of the Roman Catholic Church.

Shrines to Sidi Ali Ben Messaoud (2.7 km) and Koubbet Sidi Abd el Kader are also at the town.

References

Communes of Algiers Province
Populated places in Tipaza Province
Archaeological sites in Algeria
Catholic titular sees in Africa
Roman towns and cities in Mauretania Caesariensis
Ancient Berber cities
Populated places in Relizane Province
Cities in Algeria